Schüler-Springorum is a surname. Notable people with the surname include:

 Horst Schüler-Springorum (1928–2015), German professor of jurisprudence
 Stefanie Schüler-Springorum (born 1962), German historian

See also
 Schuler
 Springorum

Compound surnames